The 2016 General Aung San Shield Final is the 6th final of the MFF Cup.
The General Aung San Shield winner will qualify to AFC Cup competition. 
The match was contested by Yangon United and Magwe at Bogyoke Aung San Stadium in Yangon. The match was played on 17 August 2016 and was the final match of the Bogyoke Aung San Cup.

Background
Yangon United were playing a record 2nd MFF Cup final. They had previously won against Nay Pyi Taw in 2011 MFF Cup final.

It is Magwe's first time ever MFF Cup final.

Ticket allocation
Both Yangon United FC and Magwe FC received a ticket allocation of 10,000 for the game. Ticket price are 1,000 MMK (Normal Ticket) and 2,000MMK (Special Ticket).

Route to the Final

Yangon United

 
Yanon United entered the competition in the Second Round as a Myanmar National League club. In their first match, Yangon United met MNL-2 new club, Mahar United. Yangon United player, Than Paing scored only goal. And Second match, Yangon defeated 3-0 against Hanthawaddy United. In Semi-final, Yangon United met their derby club Yadanarbon. Yangon United drew 1-1 in their home stadium and won 2-1 at Bahtoo Stadium.

Magwe

Also MNL club, Magwe won 2-1 against Chin United in their first match. And then, Magwe met with Biggest team Shan United and won 1-0. In Semi-final, Magwe defeated Zwekapin United won 2-0 at Home and 1-2 at Away. Then, they reached their first ever General Aung San Shield final.

Match

Details

Statistics

Broadcasting rights

These matches will be broadcast live on Myanmar television:

References

General Aung San Shield
2016 in Burmese football